South Dakota Highway 244 (SD 244) is a short state highway located entirely within Pennington County, South Dakota which provides access to Mount Rushmore. Highway 244 runs generally east–west between its eastern terminus at US 16A near Keystone and its western terminus at US 16/US 385 south of Hill City. The entire route is part of the Peter Norbeck Scenic Byway. SD 244 does not connect to its parent route.

Route description
SD 244 begins in the Black Hills National Forest at an intersection with U.S. Route 16 (US 16) and US 385 south of Hill City.  It heads to the east, winding through the forest where it passes Summit Peak.  Near Old Baldy Mountain, the route enters the Mount Rushmore National Monument area.  It curves around the park and heads back to the north.  The route ends at US 16A south of Keystone.

History
Highway 244 was originally part of South Dakota Highway 87. The switch to Highway 244 occurred in 1975, with the signs being concurrently posted until January 1, 1977.

Major intersections

References

External links
South Dakota Highways: Highway 244

244
Black Hills
Transportation in Pennington County, South Dakota